Sibiloi National Park lies on the northeastern shore of Lake Turkana in northern Kenya. It was listed as a UNESCO World Heritage Site in 1997 as a part of Lake Turkana National Parks.  

Sibiloi National Park is located on the wild and rugged shores of Lake Turkana – the cradle of mankind - Sibiloi is home to important archaeological sites including Koobi Fora where the fossil remains have contributed more to the understanding of human evolution than any other site in the continent. The area is characterized by semi-desert habitat and open plains flanked by volcanic formations including Mount Sibiloi, where the remains of a petrified forest can be seen.

Background
The park was named for Mount Sibiloi in view at Alia Bay on the south perimeter. There also is located the park headquarters of the Kenya Wildlife Service, the administering authority; camping and short-stay facilities for visitors; and the Koobi Fora Museum. Koobi Fora Spit with the facilities of the Koobi Fora research Center are to the north, but are accessible through guided tours.

The most famous remains from the park are the Australopithecus and early Homo fossils. These have been moved to Nairobi, but fossil non-humanoids are on display in the museum.

See also 
 Koobi Fora
 Lake Turkana

References

External links 
 

National parks of Kenya
World Heritage Sites in Kenya
Lake Turkana
Eastern Province (Kenya)
Protected areas established in 1973
1973 establishments in Kenya
Monuments and memorials in Kenya